is an autobahn in northern Germany that connects the large metropolitan regions of Hamburg and Berlin. It was one of the three transit access roads to West Berlin during the Cold War.

On that road, there is a 150 km (93 mi) long section that has no speed limit at all (only a recommended speed of 130 km/h), which means that about 65% of that Autobahn can be driven at very high speed.

History 
Planning for the autobahn began as far back as the 1930s; before World War II numerous bridges and sections of roadside shoulder were built between Hamburg and Berlin. The German divide, however, put a hold on further work and it was not until 1978 that construction was resumed, carried out by a GDR work force and paid for by West Germany. In 1982 the A 24 could finally be opened. Most pre-war bridges could not be used, however, and were replaced by new structures.

Exit list

|}

Pictures

External links 

24
A024
A024
A024
A024
Buildings and structures in Oberhavel